The Oscar Leibhart Site, designated (36YO9) is a historic archaeological site located at Lower Windsor Township, York County, Pennsylvania.  It was the site of a prehistoric and protohistoric village.  The site was first discovered by 1910, with more extensive digging between 1925 and 1936.  In 1956, the Pennsylvania State Museum undertook an excavation of a longhouse and grave sites. Another excavation took place in August 1975.   Artifacts uncovered from the site date to the Early Woodland Period (1000 B.C. - 200 B.C.) and late-17th century.

It was added to the National Register of Historic Places in 1984.

References

Archaeological sites on the National Register of Historic Places in Pennsylvania
Geography of York County, Pennsylvania
National Register of Historic Places in York County, Pennsylvania